The Delta IV Heavy (Delta 9250H) is an expendable heavy-lift launch vehicle, the largest type of the Delta IV family. It is the world's third highest-capacity launch vehicle in operation, behind NASA's Space Launch System and SpaceX's Falcon Heavy and closely followed by CASC's Long March 5. It is manufactured by United Launch Alliance (ULA) and was first launched in 2004. ULA will retire the Delta IV Heavy in 2024. , two flights remain.

The Delta IV Heavy consists of a central Common Booster Core (CBC), with two additional CBCs as liquid rocket boosters instead of the GEM-60 solid rocket motors used by the Delta IV Medium+ versions. At lift off, all three cores operate at full thrust, and 44 seconds later the center core throttles down to 55% to conserve fuel until booster separation. The boosters burn out at 242 seconds after launch and are separated as the core booster throttles back up to full thrust. The core burns out 86 seconds later, and the second stage completes the ascent to orbit.

The launch vehicle uses three RS-68 engines, one in the central core and one in each booster.

History 

The Delta IV line of rockets was developed by McDonnell Douglas. The program was later handed off to  United Launch Alliance. The Delta IV Heavy is the most powerful member of the line, which also includes the smaller Delta IV Medium. It is an all liquid-fueled launch vehicle, consisting of an upper stage, one main booster and two strap-on boosters.

The first launch of the Delta IV Heavy in 2004 carried a boilerplate payload and was a partial failure. Cavitation in the liquid-oxygen propellant lines caused shutdown of both boosters eight seconds early, and the core engine nine seconds early; this resulted in a lower staging velocity for which the second stage was unable to compensate. The payload was left in a lower than intended orbit. Its first operational payload was the DSP-23 satellite, successfully launched in 2007; it was then used to launch a further five visual and electronic reconnaissance satellites for the National Reconnaissance Office (NRO) through 2013.

In December 2014, the Delta IV Heavy was used to launch an un-crewed test flight of the Orion spacecraft, designated Exploration Flight Test 1 (EFT-1). After several delays, the mission was successfully launched at 12:05 UTC on 5 December 2014.

On 12 August 2018, the Delta IV Heavy with an additional Star 48BV third stage was used to launch the Parker Solar Probe into an elliptical heliocentric orbit.

Capabilities 
Capacity of the Delta IV Heavy:
 Low Earth orbit (LEO), 200 km × 28.7°:  
 Low Earth orbit (ISS), 407 km × 51.6°:  
 Geosynchronous transfer orbit (GTO):  
 Geosynchronous orbit (GEO):  
 Lunar transfer orbit (LTO): 
 Mars transfer orbit:  

Launch history

Comparable vehicles 

Current:
 Long March 5 (geostationary transfer orbit)
 Long March 5B (low Earth orbit)
 Long March 7A (geostationary transfer orbit)
 Ariane 5
 Falcon Heavy
 Proton-M

In development:
 Angara A5
 New Glenn
 Vulcan Centaur

Retired or cancelled:
 Atlas V Heavy (proposed, never developed)
 Saturn IB (retired)
 Titan III (retired)
 Titan IV (retired)

See also 

 Heavy-lift launch vehicle
 Comparison of orbital launch systems
 Comparison of orbital rocket engines
 Comparison of space station cargo vehicles
 National Launch System, (1991–1993) study

References

External links 
 Delta IV Booster Integration Another Step Toward First Orion Flight

Delta (rocket family)
Vehicles introduced in 2004